Lake Shore High School is a public high school located in Angola, Erie County, New York, United States. It is the only high school operated by the Evans-Brant Central School District (Lake Shore). It serves students in the Town of Evans and Village of Angola, the Town of Brant and a portion of the Cattaraugus Indian Reservation. The current principal is Dr. Katy Berner-Wallen, the current assistant principals are Mrs.Julie Schwab, and Mr. Daryl Besant.

Footnotes

Schools in Erie County, New York
Public high schools in New York (state)